Pacifique Niyongabire (born 15 March 2000) is a Burundian professional footballer who plays as a winger for Valour FC in the Canadian Premier League and the Burundi national football team.

Early life
Niyongabire was born in Burundi, and spent his early childhood in Tanzania, before migrating to Australia with his family at age seven. In Australia, he played youth football with the Playford City Patriots SC and Gawler SC, before joining Adelaide United at age 17.

Club career
Niyongabire was initially given a scholarship to the Adelaide United Football Schools, after being discovered by the club. He began playing for the Adelaide United NPL team in the second-tier NPL South Australia. On 14 January 2018, he was called up to the Adelaide United FC first team in the A-League Men, making his professional debut against Sydney FC. In March 2018, he signed a two-and-a-half year scholarship contract with the first team. On 30 July 2020, he scored his first A-League goal against Perth Glory FC. In June 2021, he departed the club, upon the expiry of his contract.

In August 2021, he signed with Perth Glory FC in the A-League Men, following a successful pre-season trial. In December 2022, he terminated his contract by mutual consent with the club to pursue another playing opportunity.

In December 2022, he signed with Canadian Premier League club Valour FC for the 2023 season.

International career
On 16 November 2022, he made his debut for the Burundi national football team in a friendly against Ivory Coast. On 19 November, he scored in a 1-0 victory in a friendly against Guinea U23.

Personal life
He is the younger brother of Elvis Kamsoba, who is also a professional footballer who also plays on the Burundi national football team.

Career statistics

Club

International

References

External links

Pacifique Niyongabire NPL Stats at MyGameDay

2000 births
Living people
Burundian footballers
Australian soccer players
Burundian emigrants to Australia
Association football forwards
Adelaide United FC players
Perth Glory FC players
National Premier Leagues players
A-League Men players
Valour FC players
Burundi international footballers